Kalasagaram Annual Cultural Festival Of Music, Dance and Drama is an annual Carnatic classical music festival held at Keyes High School in Secunderabad, Telangana. Kalasagaram is known for introducing young talent in Hyderabad.

History
The festival was started  in 1967.

The 2009 festival
The festival was held between 27 and 6 December at Keyes Girls High School, Secunderabad at 6.00 p.m.

 Maitreyi Jayaseelan
 Malladi Brothers
 Lalgudi G.J.R. Krishnan and his sister Vijayalakshmi
 3 December - Sudha Raghunathan - vocal
 4 December - Rajesh Vaidhya (veena)
 5 www.saaranimusic.org

Past events

2008
The festival performances of Anantharaman (violin) T.M. Krishna, Gayathri Venkataraghavan, Rajani and Gayathri, Sikkili Gurucharan (all vocal), Shashank (flute).

See also

List of Indian classical music festivals

References 

Carnatic classical music festivals
Festivals in Hyderabad, India
Recurring events established in 1967
Music festivals in India
Music festivals established in 1967
Hindu music festivals